Zurgan-Debe (Zurgaan Debe) is a rural locality (an ulus) in Selenginsky District, Republic of Buryatia, Russia. The population was 878 as of 2010. There are 39 streets.

Geography 
Zurgan-Debe is located 64 km southeast of Gusinoozyorsk (the district's administrative centre) by road.

References 

Rural localities in Selenginsky District